Francisco de Paula Martínez de la Rosa y Cornejo (March 10, 1787 – February 7, 1862) was a Spanish statesman and dramatist and the first prime minister of Spain to receive the title of President of the Council of Ministers.

Biography
He was born  at Granada, and educated at the university there.

He won popularity with a series of epigrams on local celebrities published under the title of El Cementerio de momo. During the struggle against Napoleon he took the patriotic side, was elected deputy, and at Cadiz produced his first play, Lo que puede un empleo, a prose comedy in the manner of the younger Leandro Fernández de Moratín. La Viuda de Padilia (1814), a tragedy modelled upon Alfieri, was less acceptable to the Spanish public.

Meanwhile, the author became more and more engulfed in politics, and in 1814 was banished to Peñón de Vélez de la Gomera on the Barbary Coast, where he remained until 1820, when he was suddenly recalled and appointed prime minister. During the next three years he was the most unpopular man in Spain; denounced as a revolutionist by the Conservatives and as a reactionary by the Liberals, he alienated the sympathies of all parties, and his rhetoric earned for him the contemptuous nickname of Rosita la Pastelera (Rosie the compromiser/cake maker).

Exiled in 1823, he took refuge in Paris, where he issued his Obras literarias (1827), including his Arte poética, in which he exaggerated the literary theories already promulgated by Luzán.

Returning to Spain in 1831, he became prime minister on the death of Ferdinand VII, but proved incapable of coping with the insurrectionary movement and resigned in 1834. It is worth noting that, before retiring, Martinez de la Rosa, as President of the Cabinet, approved the royal decree that finally abolished the Spanish Inquisition.

He was ambassador at Paris in 1839-1840 and at Rome in 1842–1843, joined the Conservative party, held many important offices, and was president of congress and director of the Spanish academy at the time of his death, which took place at Madrid on the 7th of February 1862.

As a statesman, Martinez de la Rosa never rose above mediocrity. It was his misfortune to be in place without real power, to struggle against a turbulent pseudo-democratic movement promoted by unscrupulous soldiers, and to contend with the intrigues of the king, the court camarilla and the clergy. But circumstances which hampered him in politics favoured his career in literature. He was not a great natural force; his early plays and poems are influenced by Leandro Moratín  or by Juan Meléndez Valdés; his Espíritu del siglo (1835) is a summary of all the commonplaces concerning the philosophy of history; his Doña Isabel de Solís (1837–1846) is an imitation of Walter Scott's historical novels.

Through the accident of his exile at Paris he was thrown into relations with the leaders of the French Romantic Movement, and was so far impressed with the innovations of the new school as to write in French a romantic piece entitled Abén Humeya (1830), which was played at the Porte Saint-Martin. On his return to Madrid Martinez de la Rosa produced La Conjuracíon de Venecia (April 23, 1834), which entitles him to be called the pioneer of the romantic drama in Spain.

References

|-
 

|-

|-

|-

1787 births
1862 deaths
People from Granada
Moderate Party (Spain) politicians
19th-century Spanish politicians
Prime Ministers of Spain
Foreign ministers of Spain
Presidents of the Congress of Deputies (Spain)
Members of the Congress of Deputies (Spain)
Politicians from Andalusia
Leaders of political parties in Spain
Spanish dramatists and playwrights
Spanish male dramatists and playwrights
Writers from Andalusia
Members of the Royal Spanish Academy
University of Granada alumni
Knights of the Golden Fleece of Spain
Presidents of the Ateneo de Madrid
Ambassadors of Spain to the United Kingdom of Great Britain and Ireland